Senator Metcalf or Metcalfe may refer to:

Members of the United States Senate
Jesse H. Metcalf (1860–1942), U.S. Senator from Rhode Island from 1924 to 1937
Lee Metcalf (1911–1978), U.S. Senator from Montana from 1961 to 1978
Thomas Metcalfe (Kentucky politician) (1780–1855), U.S. Senator from Kentucky from 1848 to 1849

United States state senate members
George R. Metcalf (1914–2002), New York State Senate
Jack Metcalf (1927–2007), Washington State Senate
Ralph Metcalf (Washington politician) (1861–1939), Washington State Senate
Steve Metcalf (fl. 1990s–2000s) North Carolina State Senate
Wilder Metcalf (1855–1935), Kansas State Senate